Nebila Abdulmelik is an Ethiopian feminist activist and prominent women's rights activist. She was well known for spearheading the campaign #JusticeforLiz which was launched in order to seek justice for a 16 year old Kenyan girl called Liz who was brutally raped in 2013.

Career 
Nebila pursued her career as an activist advocating for women's rights. She has travelled to over 30 countries and has worked with several human rights organisations. She worked with a few Pan-American women's rights organisations including FEMNET, African Union with the African Governance Architectural Secretariat. 

In 2013, she launched an online petition titled #JusticeforLiz following the gang rape of Liz and the petition garnered more than 2 million signatures demanding death sentence for the rapists. 

Two years later, in 2015, she specifically advocated for the creation of Sustainable Development Goal Number 5, during the development of the Global Goals.

In August 2021, she was listed as one of the seven African women activists who deserve a Wikipedia article by the Global Citizen, an international organisation and advocacy organisation.

References 

Living people
Ethiopian women's rights activists
Ethiopian women activists
Year of birth missing (living people)
People from Addis Ababa
21st-century Ethiopian women
21st-century Ethiopian people